Sunzamul Islam (born 17 January 1990), also known as Sanjamul Islam, is a Bangladeshi cricketer. He was born in Rajshahi.

Domestic career
In Round 2 of the 2016–17 Bangladesh Cricket League, playing for North Zone, he took 9 wickets for 80 runs in the second innings. He was named as man of the match. His figures are the third-best by a Bangladeshi bowler in a first-class match.

Along with Shuvagata Hom, he was the joint-leading wicket-taker in the 2016–17 Bangladesh Cricket League, with a total of 25 dismissals. In October 2018, he was named in the squad for the Chittagong Vikings team, following the draft for the 2018–19 Bangladesh Premier League. He was the leading wicket-taker for North Zone in the tournament, with 29 dismissals in six matches. In November 2019, he was selected to play for the Cumilla Warriors in the 2019–20 Bangladesh Premier League.

International career
In March 2017, he was included in Bangladesh's One Day International (ODI) squad for their series against Sri Lanka, although he did not play. The following month, he was named in Bangladesh's Twenty20 International (T20I) squad for the matches against Sri Lanka, although again he did not play. Later the same month, he was named in Bangladesh's ODI squads for the 2017 Ireland Tri-Nation Series and the 2017 ICC Champions Trophy. He made his ODI debut for Bangladesh against Ireland on 19 May 2017. His debut went okay for him as he picked up two wickets while bowling at a healthy economy. Bangladesh went on to win the match by 8 wickets.

In January 2018, he was added to Bangladesh's Test squad for their series against Sri Lanka. He made his Test debut on 31 January 2018 against Sri Lanka.

References

External links
 
 

1990 births
Living people
Bangladeshi cricketers
Bangladesh One Day International cricketers
Bangladesh North Zone cricketers
People from Rajshahi District
Prime Doleshwar Sporting Club cricketers
Brothers Union cricketers
Comilla Victorians cricketers
Rajshahi Division cricketers
Khulna Tigers cricketers
Dhaka Dominators cricketers
Chattogram Challengers cricketers
South Asian Games gold medalists for Bangladesh
South Asian Games medalists in cricket